Bozavand (also, Bozavend) is a village and municipality in the Agsu Rayon of Azerbaijan.  It has a population of 1,068.

References 

Populated places in Agsu District